Corporate is a French thriller film released on 5 April 2017, that was written and directed by Nicolas Silhol.

Plot 
Émilie Tesson-Hansen is a brilliant and cold personnel manager at Esen, an industrial food group. One of her team members has been repeatedly trying to meet with her. He finally accosts her in the street where she tells him that he is not wanted and should quit. Soon after, he kills himself by jumping off of the building. An investigation is opened by a labor inspector. Considered to be at fault in the eyes of the director of human resources and her superiors, Emilie decides to avoid prison and save her skin. She reveals to the investigator the pernicious harassment methods and workplace bullying practiced at Esen.

Cast 
 Céline Sallette as Émilie Tesson-Hansen
 Lambert Wilson as Stéphane Froncart, CHRO
 Violaine Fumeau as Marie Borrel, l'inspectrice de travail
 Stéphane De Groodt as Vincent
 Charlie Anson as Colin Hansen, Émilie's husband
 Alice de Lencquesaing as Sophie, Émilie's assistant
 Camille Japy as Catherine, a colleague
 Hyam Zaytoun as Patricia Suarez, Froncart's assistant
 Jacques Chambon as CFO
 Arnaud Bedouët as Jean-Louis Maury
 Xavier De Guillebon as Didier Dalmat
 Edith Saulnier as Juliette Dalmat, Didier's daughter
 Nathalie Sportiello as CCO
 Pierre-Loup Silhol as Léo Hansen
 Yun Lai as a Korean businessman

Reception 
In France, the film got critical acclaim. A critic, Florence Vasca, in AngersMag wrote, "the film is asking where is the limit of a human being when his career is at stake."

References

External links
 

2017 films
2017 drama films
2017 thriller drama films
2010s business films
French thriller drama films
2010s French-language films
Films about criticism and refusal of work
Films about suicide
2010s French films